Thea Louise Gill (born April 5, 1970) is a Canadian actress best known for her starring role as Lindsay Peterson in the Showtime television series Queer as Folk.

Early life
As a child, Gill lived in Vancouver and attended a private girls' school there for twelve years. After graduating from the private school, Gill attended university at York University in Toronto. Gill graduated from York University in 1992 with a BFA Honours in Theatre Performance.

Career
After graduating from York, Gill lived in Toronto and spent the next several years working in theatre, guest roles in television series, commercials, and some film roles.

Gill's big break came in 2000 when she auditioned for and received the role of Lindsay Peterson in Queer as Folk. Gill held this role for the five season run of Queer as Folk.
In 2001 Gill moved from Toronto to Victoria, British Columbia. Gill divided her time between Toronto (shooting Queer as Folk) and Victoria up to 2005 when Queer as Folk concluded.

With the conclusion of Queer as Folk, Gill has had a number of theatre, television, and film roles. In 2006 she joined the cast of the here! network original series Dante's Cove, billed as a "special guest star" in the role of Diana Childs. In a July 2007 interview, Gill stated that she decided to move to Los Angeles for a year to an attempt to find longer-term acting roles.

In addition to her acting work, Gill is also a jazz singer and has worked as the Midsummer Lounge's featured act on board the Mediterranean and Caribbean cruise ship M.S. Carousel. Gill also did in 2002 a three-night solo singing act at the jazz club, Top o' the Senator, in Toronto. In 2005, Gill appeared in director Richard Bell's Eighteen as a seductive World War II-era chanteuse. This marked Gill's first singing performance in a movie. The song, "In a Heartbeat", was written by Bramwell Tovey and was later nominated for a Genie Award.

Personal life
Gill's partner since 2013 is author Gina Glass. Gill was previously married for 16 years to Brian Richmond, a Canadian director, from 1993–2009. When Gill was asked in 2003, during her time on Queer As Folk, "Would you say you are bisexual?", she confirmed this saying, "I guess, well I've thought about that a lot. And I guess perhaps I am." She is also close friends with fellow Queer As Folk co-star Michelle Clunie.

Filmography

Film

Television

Awards and nominations
2003, won a Golden Sheaf Award for her work in an episode of Bliss
2003, received The National Leadership Award from the National Gay and Lesbian Task Force.
2003, nominated for an ACTRA Award for 'Outstanding Performance' for her role in Queer as Folk
2005, won a Leo Award for 'Best Guest Performance by a Female' for her work on an episode of The Collector.
2007, nominated for a Leo Award for 'Best Actress in a Short Drama' for Swap

References

External links

1970 births
20th-century Canadian actresses
21st-century Canadian actresses
Actresses from Vancouver
Bisexual actresses
Canadian film actresses
Canadian stage actresses
Canadian television actresses
Canadian LGBT actors
Canadian LGBT singers
Living people
Musicians from Vancouver
York University alumni
21st-century Canadian LGBT people
20th-century Canadian LGBT people